Arthur Engel may refer to:

Arthur B. Engel (1914–1992), rear admiral in US Coast Guard
Arthur Engel (mathematician) (born 1928), German mathematics teacher, educationalist and author
Arthur Engel (numismatist) (1855–1935), French archaeologist and numismatist

See also
Arthur "Arkie" Engle (born 1965), American tennis player